Riotorto is a town in Tuscany, central Italy, administratively a frazione of the comune of Piombino, province of Livorno.

Riotorto is about 80 km from Livorno and 15 km from Piombino.

Bibliography 
 

Frazioni of Piombino